= Brewsterdale, West Virginia =

Unincorporated community in West Virginia, US

Coordinates: 37°14′57″N 81°33′05″W

Brewsterdale is an unincorporated community in McDowell County, in the U.S. state of West Virginia.

== History ==
A post office called Brewsterdale was established in 1915, and remained in operation until 1932. The community's name honors the Brewster family of settlers.
